Kaon Media is a South Korean technology company, which specialises in the development and manufacturing of digital connectivity devices (including set-top boxes) and residential gateways for pay-TV operator, broadband operators and telcos. It provides digital broadcasting services to more than 120 operators in 80 countries. The company is based in Sungnam city, South Korea and was founded in 2001.

In November 2013, KAONMEDIA announced that it has started to provide Android set-top boxes, with the latest Google services for TV, on South Korean broadband; this is the world's first commercial launch of IPTV with the latest Android OS (Jellybean 4.2).

In February 2021, the company partnered with Minim and Irdeto to preintegrate their Trusted Home solution into its cable gateway.

References

External links
 

Mass media companies of South Korea
Seongnam
Companies based in Gyeonggi Province
Interactive television
Television technology
Digital television
Internet broadcasting
Streaming television
Multimedia
Streaming media systems
Video on demand services
South Korean companies established in 2001